Tibor Gergely (  August 3, 1900 – January 13, 1978) was a Hungarian-American artist best known for his illustration of popular children's picture books. His work was part of the painting event in the art competition at the 1928 Summer Olympics.

Biography
Born in Budapest in 1900, into a middle-class Jewish family, he studied art briefly in Vienna before immigrating to the United States in 1939, where he settled in New York City.  Largely a self-taught artist, he also contributed several covers of The New Yorker, mostly during the 1940s.  Among the most popular children's books Gergely illustrated are The Happy Man and His Dump Truck, Busy Day Busy People, The Magic Bus (by Maurice Doblier), The Little Red Caboose, The Fire Engine Book, Tootle, Five Little Firemen, Five Hundred Animals from A to Z, and Scuffy the Tugboat. Many of his better known books were published by Little Golden Books.  His best work is collected in "The Great Big Book of Bedtime Stories". He became a U.S. citizen in 1948. Gergely died in 1978, in New York.

As of 2001, Tootle was the all-time third best-selling hardcover children's book in English, and Scuffy the Tugboat was the eighth all-time bestseller.

References

External links
 

 Tibor Gergely

1900 births
1978 deaths
American children's book illustrators
Hungarian illustrators
Hungarian emigrants to the United States
Little Golden Books
Olympic competitors in art competitions
Jewish American artists
20th-century American Jews